Goodbye Cruel World: The Best Of Custard is a best of compilation by Australian band, Custard. The album was released in May 2000 and peaked at number 64 on the ARIA Charts.

Track listing

Charts

References

2000 albums
Compilation albums by Australian artists
Custard (band) compilation albums